St Cynidr was a 6th-century Catholic pre-congregational saint of South Wales and first Bishop of Glasbury, Powys.

Veneration
Cynidr is buried in Glasbury, where he is venerated with a feast day of April 27.

The Parochial church of St Cynidr (St Kenider) at Glasbury commemorates his work although the current church was built c.1088AD. A holy well in the town is also attributed to him.

Family

Cynidr was the son of St. Gwladys, grand son of King Brychan and the brother of St Eigon, the Patron Saint of Llanigon, near Glasbury.

References

Medieval Welsh saints
6th-century Christian saints
Roman Catholic monks
Year of birth unknown
6th century in Wales
Geography of Carmarthenshire
History of Carmarthenshire
Children of Brychan
6th-century Welsh people
6th-century births
Year of death unknown
Welsh heraldry
6th-century Christian clergy
Welsh hermits